Thomas “TJ” Johnson (born November 27, 1957 in Thomasville, North Carolina) is an American audio engineer, producer, and musician. He is best known for his work with Porno for Pyros and Rancid.

Johnson has been an active professional in the industry since 1981, and trained at the Recording Workshop, an audio-engineering school in Chillicothe, Ohio.

Johnson's involvement with Porno for Pyros began during the recording of their second album, Good God's Urge, on which Johnson engineered, co-produced, and played.
Following the album's release, Johnson toured with Porno for Pyros from 1995 until the spring of 1997, providing samples, playing keyboards, and singing backing vocals.
During that time, Johnson also recorded new tracks for what should have been Porno for Pyros's third album, which were instead released on Perry Farrell’s solo effort Song Yet to Be Sung and Jane's Addiction’s Kettle Whistle.

Johnson has worked with an array of major and independent labels including Sony Music, Warner Bros. Records, Capitol Records, Mercury Records, Virgin Records, Geffen, and RCA. He also did work for Epitaph Records, and its offshoot, Hellcat Records.

In the spring of 1997, Johnson started a long relationship with Rancid, resulting in his recording Life Won't Wait and Rancid 2000 for the Bay Area punk band.

Although still active in the recording realm, Johnson now teaches in the Entertainment Technology Department at Guilford Technical Community College (GTCC).

2010

2007

2006

2002

2001

2000

1999

1998

1997

1996

1995

1994

References

1957 births
Living people
Record producers from North Carolina
American audio engineers
People from Thomasville, North Carolina